HIStory (pronounced "his story") is a Taiwanese anthology streaming television series created by Chang Ting-fei for Choco TV and Line TV. Each season presents stand-alone stories with different plots and main characters focusing on the theme of boys' love, also known as BL. The first season premiered on February 14, 2017.

The series has accumulated a large international following and is well-received by critics. In Taiwan, the series hit 3.5 million views after the first three months of release, and 16.5 million views by the end of the second season. HIStory is the first Taiwanese web drama to air on Japanese television, with the first season premiering on Japan's Nippon TV on July 31, 2017. On July 2, 2018, the series had its primetime television debut in Taiwan through CTS, airing the first two seasons back-to-back throughout the month. Season two's HIStory2: Crossing the Line received critical acclaim for its characterization, directing, and acting, earning a Golden Bell nomination for Best Miniseries. Its film sequel, Crossover (跨界) was announced on August 17, 2018, but was cancelled due to adjustment of content strategy due to the COVID-19 pandemic, subsequently announcing the fourth season being under works. Season five premiered on December 28, 2022.

Series overview

HIStory1 

My Hero 

Plot
During a mission to collect the soul of college student Ku Ssu-jen, whose time on earth is dwindling, grim reaper Pai Chang-chang accidentally captures Lan Hsi's soul instead, killing her. To avoid punishment by the gods, Pai Chang-chang tries to find a way to help Lan Hsi return to Earth, but her body is cremated, rendering her unable to return to her original body. In a rage, Lan Hsi's soul takes over Ku Ssu-jen's body. She uses this opportunity to try to get back with her boyfriend Mai Ying-hsiung (Hero), but she only has seven days for her boyfriend to fall in love with her new body. Otherwise her soul, and Ku Ssu-jen, will die. 

Cast
 as Mai Ying-hsiung "Hero", Lan Hsi's boyfriend
 as Ku Ssu-jen, an unlucky lonely boy who has a crush on Hero
 as Lan Hsi, whose soul takes over Ku Ssu-jen's body
 as Pai Chang-chang, the grim reaper
 as Ya Chin, Hero and Ssu-jen's roommate

Stay Away from Me 

Plot
When their parents get married and leave for a long honeymoon, superstar Cheng Ching moves in with his new stepbrother Feng He. With Cheng Ching on the brink of failing out of college, their parents entrust Feng He to tutor him. Meng Meng, Feng He's fujoshi best friend, starts dreaming of the perfect BL fanfic and tries to push the two together, but will Feng He be able to stay away from his brother?

Cast
 as Cheng Ching, a popular idol who tries to balance work life and school
 Duke Wu also appears as Cheng Ching in Make Our Days Count of HIStory3 as a nephew of Lu Chih-kang.
 as Feng He, Cheng Ching's older step brother and love interest
 as Meng Meng, Feng Ho's best friend who ships Cheng Qing and Feng He together
Wang Ying-ying as Feng He's mother

Obsessed 

Plot
Shao Yi-chen, a man who dies in an accident following a scuffle with his ex-boyfriend Chiang Chin-teng, is reborn and sent back 9 years. To save his future self, he avoids Chin-teng and his feelings for him. Yi-chen proceeds to destroy his diary, where he writes about his longtime feelings for him. Chin-teng discovers a few pages, and develops a growing curiosity about Yi-chen which he can't explain. Yi-chen himself realizes that he can't resist Chin-teng, no matter how many times he tries to not fall for him again.

Cast
 as Chiang Chin-teng, a law student who was Shao Yi-chen's lover in his previous life. After discovering a few pages from Yi-chen's diary, he grows curious of him and feigns amnesia to get closer to him
 as Shao Yi-chen, who is reborn and sent back 9 years. He is determined to start a new life, but finds it difficult to avoid Chin-teng, whom he still loves
 as Tsai Yi-chun, Chin-teng's childhood friend who has a crush on him
 as Lei Chung-chun, Chin-teng's childhood friend
Johnson Chang as Li Mu-pai, Yi-chen's best friend who becomes Chung-chun's lover
Jerry Wu as Che Kang, Chin-teng's friend
Wang Ying-ying as Yi-chen's mother

HIStory2 

Right or Wrong 
Right or Wrong accumulated 4.25 million views during its run.

Plot
Shih Yi-chieh, an associate professor of the anthropology department, is a divorced father with a 6-year-old daughter. Upon chance, he hires college student Fei Sheng-che ("Xiao Fei") to be his daughter's babysitter. After years of having dysfunctional work hours and inconsistent meals, Xiao Fei's presence at home brings huge changes to Yi-chieh's life, and he falls in love. But the family of three's lives gets disrupted when Yi-chieh's ex-wife comes back into his life, in hopes to rekindle their failed marriage.

Cast
 as Shih Yi-chieh, 31-year-old associate professor of the anthropology department
 as Fei Sheng-che ("Xiao Fei"), 19-year-old college student who is hired by Yi-chieh to be his daughter's babysitter
Ye Yi-en as Shi Ke-you ("You You"), Yi-chieh's 7-year-old daughter
Shelby Su as Ye Wen-ling ("Ye Zi"), Xiao Fei's close friend 
 as Chou Hsin-ju, Yi-chieh's ex-wife and Ke-you's mother
Chu Meng-hsuan as Chou Shao-an, Xiao Fei's classmate and Hsin-ju's younger brother
 as Auntie Juan, Xiao Fei's mother
 as Chiang Chao-peng, Yi-chieh's friend

Crossing the Line 
Crossing the Line accumulated over 4.56 million views during its run and is the only series in the HIStory anthology to receive a Golden Bell nomination for Best Miniseries.

Plot
New transfer student Hsia Yu-hao joins the Zhihong High School volleyball club and gradually falls in love with the senior student Chiu Tzu-hsuan.

Cast
 as Chiu Tzu-hsuan, a studious and stern 12th grade student at Zhihong High. A former star athlete for the volleyball team, Tzu-hsuan was forced to retire after a serious injury rendered him unable to play. To continue his pursuit in volleyball, he volunteers to be the team's manager, assisting in managing the team's funds and training the players.
Fandy Fan as Hsia Yu-hao, an 11th grade student. Rebellious but righteous, he was transferred out of his previous high school after getting involved in a fight protecting a younger student. Possessing athletic talent, Yu-hao is talked into joining Zhihong High's volleyball team despite having no initial interest in the sport.
 as Wang Chen-wen, Yu-hao's best friend who follows him into Zhihong High. He has a crush on his older step-brother, but keeps his feelings locked up.
Patrick Shih as Wang Chen-wu, Yu-hao's other best friend and Chen-wen's older step-brother. Originally a 12th grade student, he gets held back a year after transferring schools with Yu-hao.
 as He Cheng-en, a 12th grade student. He is the captain of the volleyball club and is close friends with Tzu-hsuan.
Hana Lin as Chiu Chien-ju, a 10th grade student at Bei Jiang High, Yu-hao's former school. Chien-ju is Tzu-hsuan's younger sister and develops a crush on Yu-hao after he saved her from bullies.
Kong Rui-jun as Ho Chung-chung, Yu-hao's homeroom teacher and volleyball coach.
 as Ho Hsiao-hsiao, a 12th grade student and Ho Chung-chung's younger sister. She is an assistant of the volleyball team and a huge fan of yaoi manga.
 as Chen Chia-chun, an 11th grade student and member of the volleyball team. He is jealous of Yu-hao's close relationship with Tzu-hsuan.
 as Li Chun-che, nicknamed "Xiao Ji Ji", an 11th grade student and member of the volleyball team.
Tang Wei-qi as Li-chi, who Chen-wen mistakes as Chen-wu's girlfriend.
 as Tseng Cheng-fan, Zhihong High's director.
Liu Hung-min and Liu Hung-chieh make cameo appearances as themselves, members of the Renhe High volleyball team, Zhihong's rival school.

Film sequel 
On August 17, 2018, Choco Media announced a film sequel, Crossover. Preparation for the film began after the broadcast of Crossing the Line in March 2018. Lu, Fan, Yang, and Shih will reprise their roles. The theatrical release for Crossing the Line 2 is planned for the fourth quarter of 2019. However, the plan was cancelled due to adjustment of content strategy due to the COVID-19 pandemic, subsequently announcing the fourth season being under works.

HIStory3 

Trapped 

Plot
A mysterious shooting leaves a police officer and the head of the Hsin Tien Group crime syndicate dead. Four years later, police investigator Meng Shao-fei is determined to hunt down Tang Yi, the sole survivor of the fateful shooting – and now the head of the Hsin Tien gang. Tang Yi is also hunting for answers but wants his own form of justice. He seems to want to exact his choice of punishment on the killer… although he appears to be hiding a dark secret. Is Tang Yi trying to protect someone?

Meng Shao-fei and Tang Yi become entangled in a deadly game of wits – a game that becomes all the more complicated after Tang Yi baits a love trap for Meng Shao-fei.

Cast
Jake Hsu as Detective Meng Shao-fei, an officer of the third investigation platoon who gets wound up in a four-year long case involving the murder of a police officer and a triad leader.
 as Tang Yi, the adopted son of triad leader Tang Kuo-tung, one of the murder victims. Tang Yi vows to find the killer and "purify" Tang's triad from drugs and other illegal businesses.
 as Fang Liang-tien "Jack", Tang Yi's trusted bodyguard.
 as Detective Chao Li-an, nicknamed "Zhao-zi", Shao-fei's friend and co-worker. Zhao-zi may be naive, but is extremely optimistic and loyal.
Chou Ming-Yu as Tang Kuo-tung
 as Tso Hung-yeh, the adopted daughter of Tang Kuo-tung.
Sphinx Ting as Ku Tao-yi, a loyal follower of Tang Kuo-tung who develops feelings for Hung-yeh.
 as Li Chih-te, Tang Yi's loyal follower who is also in love with him.
 as Chen Wen-hao, a powerful drug dealer whom is believed to be Tang Kuo-tung's killer.
He Long as Detective Shih Ta-pao, leader of the third investigation platoon.
Amy Yen as Detective Huang Yu-chi, an officer of the third investigation platoon who has a crush on Shao-fei.
 as Chou Kuan-chih, an officer of the third investigation platoon who is linked to the murder case.

Make Our Days Count 

Plot
High schoolers Hsiang Hao-ting and Yu Hsi-ku appear to be polar opposites: While Hao-ting is an outgoing, hot-headed extravert and some-time bully, Hsi-ku prefers to keep a low profile and focus on his schoolwork. What will happen when the two worlds collide as their relationship ensued?

Casts
 as Xiang Hao-ting, a hot-headed third-year high school student who is preparing for his college entrance exams
 as Yu Xi-gu, Hao-ting's love interest who assists him in his studies
 as Lu Zhi-gang, the owner of a dessert shop who falls for a high school student
 as Sun Bo-Xiang, nicknamed Sun Bo, Hao-ting's close friend and classmate who is comfortable with his sexual orientation, and has a crush on the older Zhi-gang
Sara Yu as Lin Cai-Zhu, Hao-ting's mother
Spark Chen as Xiang Qing-chang, Hao-ting's father
Brent Hsu as Sun Wen-chieh, Sun Bo's older cousin who owns the gym of where he works
Xia En as Xia En, Hao-ting's close friend and classmate
Xia De as Xia De, En's younger twin brother and fellow classmate
 as Gao Xiao Chun, Hao-ting's close friend and classmate
Cai Mu-fei as Xiang Yong-Xing, Hao-ting's younger sister
Wang Chen-lin as Li Si-Yu, Hao-ting's ex-girlfriend
Cindy Chi as Liu Mei-fang, a fujoshi, friend of Li Si-Yu and admires Yu Xi-gu

HIStory4 
HIStory4 is the fourth season of the HIStory series. Unlike its predecessors, it is one main series, Close To You.

Close To You 

Main Casts

  as Xiao Li-cheng
  as Teng Mu-ren
  as Ye Xing-si
  as Fu Yong-jie
 Cindy Chi as Liu Mei-fang, a fujoshi
 Cindy Chi first appeared as Liu Mei-fang in Make Our Days Count of HIStory3 as a supporting role.

Awards and nominations

Notes

References

External links
 
 
 

2010s LGBT-related drama television series
2010s Taiwanese television series
2010s teen drama television series
2017 Taiwanese television series debuts
Taiwanese drama television series
Taiwanese boys' love television series
Mandarin-language television shows
Television shows set in Taiwan
Taiwanese LGBT-related web series